Graham Allen may refer to:
Graham Allen (politician) (born 1953), UK Labour politician
Graham Allen (footballer) (born 1977), English footballer
Graham Allen (writer) (born 1963), UK-born Irish writer and academic

See also
Allen (surname)